Sanjida (romanised: Sanjida/Sanjeeda) is a Bangladeshi feminine given name.

Notable people

 Sanjida Islam (born 1996), Bangladeshi International cricketer
 Sanjida Khatun (born 1932), Bangladeshi musicologist
 Sanjida Akhter (born 2001), Bangladeshi footballer

Bangladeshi feminine given names